Torrent or torrents may refer to:

 A fast flowing stream

Animals 
 Torrent duck, a species of the family Anatidae
 Torrent fish
 Torrent frog, various unrelated frogs
 Torrent robin, a bird species
 Torrent salamander, a family of salamanders

Arts and entertainment 
 Torrent (1926 film), starring Greta Garbo
 The Torrent (1924 film), film directed by William Doner and A. P. Younger
 The Torrent (Le Torrent), 2012 Canadian film directed by Simon Lavoie
 The Torrents, a 1955 Australian play
 Torrent (play) (Kuángliú), a Chinese play about the life of Tian Han
 Torrent (TV series), a technology show

Computing 
 BitTorrent, a peer-to-peer file sharing (P2P) communications protocol
 Torrent file, stores metadata used for BitTorrent

Corporations 
 Torrent Group, an Indian business house, and its subsidiary companies:
 Torrent Cables
 Torrent Pharmaceuticals
 Torrent Power

People 
 Ana Torrent (born 1966), Spanish actress
 Domènec Torrent (born 1962), Spanish professional football manager
 Marion Torrent (born 1992), French footballer
 Ramon Torrents (born 1937), Spanish comic book artist
 Stanislas Torrents (1839–1916), French painter

Places 
 Torrent, Valencia, a city in Spain
 Torrent, Girona, a Spanish village
 Torrent Bay, New Zealand
 Torrent Falls, an outdoor area in Kentucky, United States
 Torrent River, which feeds into the bay
 River Torrent, Northern Ireland
 Torrenthorn, a mountain of the Bernese Alps, Valais, Switzerland
 Torrent, Switzerland, a ski area on Torrenthorn, near Leukerbad

Vehicles
 Pontiac Torrent, a crossover SUV automobile by GM's Pontiac from 2005 to 2009
 Torrent (ship), an American sailing ship wrecked in 1868

Other uses 
 FC Milwaukee Torrent, a semi-professional soccer team based in Milwaukee, Wisconsin
 Les Torrents, the sports teams of the Université du Québec en Outaouais, Gatineau, Quebec, Canada

See also 

 Torment (disambiguation)
 Torrente (disambiguation)
 Torrentz, a meta-search engine for BitTorrent